Xia Ningning (born 4 January 1987 in Qingdao, Shandong) is a Chinese football player who currently plays for Shanghai Shenxin in the China League One.

Club career
Xia Ningning made his senior club debut on 25 June 2008 for Shandong Luneng as a substitute in a league game vs. Changsha Ginde in a 1–0 victory. Due to his ability to play on the left side of the pitch he would be used as a versatile substitute throughout the season and gained himself a league title medal at the end of the season.
On 11 January 2014, Xia transferred to China League One side Tianjin Songjiang.

On 16 February 2017, Xia transferred to League One side Shanghai Shenxin.

Honours
Shandong Luneng
Chinese Super League: 2008, 2010

Tianjin Songjiang
China League One: 2016

References

External links
Player profile at Shandong Luneng website (Chinese)
Shandong Luneng Player Profile at Sina website
Player stats at Sohu website
 

1987 births
Living people
Chinese footballers
Footballers from Qingdao
Shandong Taishan F.C. players
Tianjin Tianhai F.C. players
Shanghai Shenxin F.C. players
Chinese Super League players
China League One players
Association football defenders
Association football midfielders